William Caldwell Coleman (October 17, 1884 – January 12, 1968) was a United States district judge of the United States District Court for the District of Maryland.

Education and career

Born in Louisville, Kentucky, Coleman received an Artium Baccalaureus degree from Harvard University in 1905 and a Bachelor of Laws from Harvard Law School in 1909. He was in private practice in Baltimore, Maryland, from 1909 to 1927. During this time, he was also an instructor at the University of Maryland Law School from 1914 to 1917, Secretary of the Maryland Educational Survey Committee in 1916, and was a Private in the United States Army during World War I in 1918.

Federal judicial service

Coleman received a recess appointment from President Calvin Coolidge on April 6, 1927, to the United States District Court for the District of Maryland, to a new seat authorized by 44 Stat. 1346. He was nominated to the same position by President Coolidge on December 6, 1927. He was confirmed by the United States Senate on December 19, 1927, and received his commission the same day. He served as Chief Judge from 1948 to 1955. His service terminated on June 1, 1955, due to his resignation.

Death

Coleman died on January 12, 1968, in Baltimore.

References

Sources
 

1884 births
1968 deaths
Judges of the United States District Court for the District of Maryland
United States district court judges appointed by Calvin Coolidge
20th-century American judges
Harvard Law School alumni
Lawyers from Baltimore
Lawyers from Louisville, Kentucky
Military personnel from Louisville, Kentucky